Flinders Council is a local government body in Tasmania, encompassing the Furneaux Group and nearby islands of Bass Strait, in the north-east of the state. Flinders is classified as a rural local government area and has a population of 987, with Whitemark the main town located on Flinders Island.

History and attributes
The municipality was established on 1 January 1907. Flinders is classified as rural, agricultural and small under the Australian Classification of Local Governments.

Geography
Flinders covers more than 60 islands off the north-eastern tip of Tasmania at the eastern end of Bass Strait.  Of these 60, 12 have permanent populations. The bigger ones are Clarke Island, Cape Barren Island, and the largest and most populous, Flinders Island. The Flinders Council includes the Furneaux Group together with the groups of islands to the north west including Kent Group, Hogan Island Group, Curtis Group, and the Wilsons Promontory Tasmanian Islands (Rodondo, West Moncoeur and East Moncoeur).

Rodondo Island is the westernmost landmass of the council area.

Localities

See also
List of local government areas of Tasmania

References

External links
Flinders Council official website
Local Government Association Tasmania
Tasmanian Electoral Commission - local government

Local government areas of Tasmania